Samanea saman is a species of flowering tree in the pea family, Fabaceae, now in the Mimosoid clade and is native to Central and South America. It is often placed in the genus Samanea, which by yet other authors is subsumed in Albizia entirely.

Its range extends from Mexico south to Peru and Brazil, but it has been widely introduced to South and Southeast Asia, as well as the Pacific Islands, including Hawaii. It is a well-known tree, rivaled perhaps only by lebbeck and pink siris among its genus.

In Cambodia it is colloquially known as the Chankiri Tree (can be written  or ).

Description

Tree 
Saman is a wide-canopied tree with a large symmetrical umbrella-shaped crown.

This species of flowering tree in the Fabaceae family is native to Central and South America but has been widely introduced across the tropics, especially South and Southeast Asia.

Its branches have velvety and hairy bark. Large branches of the tree tend to break off, particularly during rainstorms. This can be hazardous as the tree is very commonly used for avenue plantation.

The tree sheds its leaves for a while during dry periods. Its crown is big and can provide shade, but allows rain to fall through into the ground beneath it.

The leaves fold in rainy weather and in the evenings, hence the names rain tree and five o'clock tree.

Flowers and seeds 
The tree has pinkish flowers with white and red stamens, set on heads with around 12–25 flowers per head. These heads may number in the thousands, covering the whole tree.

The seed pods of the tree are curved and leathery; they contain sticky, edible flesh covering the flat, oval seeds.

Names 
In English it is usually known as rain tree or saman. It is also known as "monkey pod", "giant thibet", "inga saman", "cow tamarind", East Indian walnut, "soar", or "suar". In English-speaking regions of the Caribbean, it is known as coco tamarind in Grenada; French tamarind in Guyana; and samaan tree in Trinidad. In Philippine English, it is confusingly simply known as "acacia", due to its resemblance to native Acacia species.

The original name, saman - known in many languages and used for the specific epithet - derives from zamang, meaning "Mimosoideae tree" in some Cariban languages of northern Venezuela. This name is also where its genus name Samanea comes from.

The origin of the name "rain tree" is unknown. It has been variously attributed to local names ki hujan or pokok hujan ("rain tree") in Indonesia and Malaysia because its leaves fold during rainy days (allowing rain to fall through the tree); the way the relative abundance of grass under the tree in comparison to surrounding areas; the steady drizzle of honeydew-like discharge of cicadas feeding on the leaves; the occasional shower of sugary secretions from the nectaries on the leaf petioles; to the shedding of stamens during heavy flowering.

In the Caribbean, it is sometimes known as marsave. It is also known as algarrobo in Cuba; guannegoul(e) in Haiti; and goango or guango in Jamaica. In French-speaking islands, it is known as gouannegoul or saman.

In Latin America, it is variously known as samán, cenízaro, cenicero, genízaro, carreto, carreto negro, delmonte, dormilón, guannegoul, algarrobo del país, algarrobo, campano, carabeli, couji, lara, urero, or zarza in Spanish; and chorona in Portuguese.

In the Pacific Islands, it is known as filinganga in the Northern Marianas; trongkon-mames in Guam; gumorni spanis in Yap; kasia kula or mohemohe in Tonga; marmar in New Guinea; ohai in Hawaii; tamalini or tamaligi in Samoa; and vaivai ni vavalangi, vaivai moce or sirsa in Fiji. The former comes from vaivai "watery" (in allusion to the tree's "rain") + vavalagi "foreign". In some parts of Vanua Levu, Fiji the word vaivai is used to describe the lebbeck, because of the sound the seedpods make, and the word mocemoce (sleepy, or sleeping) is used for A. saman due to the 'sleepiness' of its leaves.

In Southeast Asia, it is known as akasya or palo de China in the Philippines; meh or trembesi in Indonesia; pukul lima ("five o'clock tree") in Malaysia and Singapore; ampil barang ("Western tamarind") in Cambodia; ก้ามปู (kampu), ฉำฉา (chamcha), จามจุรีแดง (chamchuri daeng), จามจุรี (chamchuri) in Thai; ကုက္ကို (kokko) in Myanmar; and còng, muồng tím, or cây mưa ("rain tree") in Vietnam.

In South Asia, it is known as shiriisha in Sanskrit; শিরীষ (shirish) in Bengali; shirish in Gujarati; सीरस (vilaiti siris) in Hindi; bagaya mara in Kannada; ചക്കരക്കായ്‌ മരം (chakkarakkay maram) in Malayalam; विलायती शिरीश in Marathi; mara in Sinhalese; தூங்குமூஞ்சி மரம் (thoongu moonji maram, "sleepy faced tree") in Tamil; and నిద్ర గన్నేరు (nidra ganneru) in Telugu.

In Madagascar, it is also known as bonara (mbaza), kily vazaha, madiromany, mampihe, or mampohehy.

In European regions where the tree does not usually grow, its names are usually direct translations of "rain tree". These include arbre à (la) pluie (France), árbol de lluvia (Spain); and Regenbaum (Germany).

Use 
The edible fruit pulp can be made into a beverage that tastes like lemons; the pulp is also an additive to gasoline.

Its wood is used for carving and making furniture.

Raintrees around the world

In Cambodia 
It is unclear when and how Chankiri was introduced to Cambodia. It is possible the tree was introduced from Brazil by the French in the 1920s, together with the rubber tree (Hevea brasiliensis) during the rubber industry's global boom in the early 1900s. It is also possible the tree came from neighboring countries in the region where the plant had been introduced earlier on by Western colonial explorers.

Since its introduction to Cambodia, the Samanea saman is known locally as chankiri (ចន្ទគិរី). It has been widely planted across the country thanks to its tall height and expansive branches that can shade large areas, and as an ornamental. The fruit is eaten, and in famine times the young leaves are eaten in salads.

Chamri is the official Khmer name for the plant because the flowers from this tree resemble the beautiful long-haired tail of the chamri (known in English as yak).  (French tamarind) is another colloquial name for it in Cambodia.

Chankiri Trees in the Killing Fields 

Since its introduction to Cambodia, Chankiri has been widely planted across the country thanks to its tall height and expansive branches that can shade large areas. Multiple chankiri can also be found in the Killing Fields, an execution field used by the Khmer Rouge during the Cambodian genocide, though the trees were planted at the field long before. Children and infants with parents accused of crimes against the regime were smashed against trees, in the hope that the children "wouldn't grow up and take revenge for their parents' deaths".

It was a coincidence that the Chankiri tree at the Killing Fields is one of the many trees against which the Khmer Rouge executioners beat young children and there are no specific associations locally between the Chankiri tree and the Khmer Rouge.

In Venezuela 
When Alexander von Humboldt travelled in the Americas from 1799–1804, he encountered a giant saman tree near Maracay, Venezuela. He measured the circumference of the parasol-shaped crown at 576 ft (about 180.8 m), its diameter was around 190 ft (about 59.6 m), on a trunk at 9 ft (about 2.8 m) in diameter and reaching just 60 ft (nearly 19 m) in height. Humboldt mentioned the tree was reported to have changed little since the Spanish colonization of Venezuela; he estimated it to be as old as the famous Canary Islands dragon tree (Dracaena draco) of Icod de los Vinos on Tenerife.

The tree, called Samán de Güere (transcribed Zamang del Guayre by von Humboldt) still stands today, and is a Venezuelan national treasure. Just like the dragon tree on Tenerife, the age of the saman in Venezuela is rather indeterminate. As von Humboldt's report makes clear, according to local tradition, it would be older than 500 years today, which is rather outstanding by the genus' standards. It is certain, however, the tree is quite more than 200 years old today, but it is one exceptional individual; even the well-learned von Humboldt could not believe it was actually the same species as the saman trees he knew from the greenhouses at Schönbrunn Castle.  A famous specimen called the "Brahmaputra Rain Tree" located at Guwahati on the banks of the Brahmaputra River in Assam, India has the thickest trunk of any Saman; approximately  diameter at breast height (DBH). The size of the pollen is around 119 microns and it is polyad of 24 to 32 grains.

In popular culture

The set was left intact after filming but was destroyed by Hurricane Flora in 1963. The tree itself has survived and is located approximately  near Goldsborough, Tobago. The figure for the tree's height comes from the motion picture company and has not been independently confirmed.

Carbon sequestration 
Carbon sequestration is the capture and long-term removal of carbon dioxide from the atmosphere. According to a research conducted at the School of Forestry of the Bogor Agricultural Institute, Indonesia, a mature tree with a crown diameter measuring  absorbed  of CO2 annually. The trees have been planted in cities of Kudus and Demak and also will be planted along the shoulder of the road from Semarang to Losari.

Gallery

Notes

Footnotes

References
  (2004): The Golden Rain Tree. Version of 2004-MAY-01. Retrieved 2008-MAR-31.
  (2005): Albizia saman. Version 10.01, November 2005. Retrieved 2008-MAR-30.
  (1815): Reise in die Aequinoctial-Gegenden des neuen Continents (Part 3). J.G. Cotta, Stuttgart and Tübingen. Image/PDF fulltext at Google Books

External links
 
 
 Hawaiian Ecosystems at Risk Project page for Samanea saman
 Reference for Telugu word Nidra Ganneru

Mimosoids
Taxa named by Nikolaus Joseph von Jacquin
Trees of Brazil
Trees of Central America
Trees of Peru